Emir Bajramović (known simply as Bajro; born 1980) is a Bosnian volleyball player at the highest national level.

He played for Bosnia's most successful volleyball club OK Kakanj in the teams that won the Premier League of Volleyball of Bosnia and Herzegovina national championship six times (2000, 2001, 2003, 2004, 2005, 2008) and the National Cup of Bosnia and Herzegovina 5 times (2001, 2002, 2003, 2004, 2006), achieving the national league and cup-winning double three times.

Emir played for OK Zenica in Division 2 (1994–1998) before moving to OK Kakanj. He returned to OK Zenica in 2008.

References

1980 births
Living people
Sportspeople from Zenica
Bosniaks of Bosnia and Herzegovina
Kakanj
Bosnia and Herzegovina men's volleyball players